A Marine Detachment, or MarDet, was a unit of 35 to 85 United States Marines aboard large warships including cruisers, battleships, and aircraft carriers. They were a regular component of a ship's company from the formation of the United States Marine Corps until 1998. Missions of the Marine Detachment evolved, and included protecting the ship's captain, security and defense of the ship, operating the brig, limited action ashore, securing nuclear weapons and ceremonial details.

History
Marines served aboard sailing ships as a small amphibious force able to capture and hold minor port facilities as required for protection of American interests. Marine sharpshooters were often stationed in the rigging during ship-to-ship combat to fire at officers and helmsmen aboard enemy warships. Marines often operated naval artillery during general quarters when the distances of gunnery engagements exceeded the range of small arms.

As modern Navy tactics evolved away from traditional ship-to-ship combat to fighting over the horizon threats with guided missiles and computer controlled weapons systems, the shipboard responsibilities requiring an independent Marine Detachment aboard ships became more of an anachronism better suited to be absorbed by Navy Master-at-arms.

The individual seaborne landing parties became Fleet Anti-terrorism Security Teams (FAST), able to rapidly deploy where and as needed instead of scattered across the fleet. By 1998, only 11 officers and 275 enlisted Marines remained assigned to individual Marine Detachments when ALMARS 24/98 announced all Marine ships' detachments were to be disestablished. USMC 1stLt Grant Goodrich would be the last commander of a MarDet when he stood down his unit aboard  on 1 May 1998, at a ceremony following their return home from their deployment.

Officers
Each MarDet included a Marine Corps commanding officer who reported to the Commandant of the Marine Corps through the ship's captain. When more than one Marine officer was assigned to a ship, United States Navy Regulations required one Marine officer to be aboard ship at all times unless excused by the ship's captain. Marine officers below the rank of major sometimes served as officer of the deck.

Horse Marines
The Marines also employed mounted Horse Detachments called "Horse Marines" in places such as Peking, China from early 1900 to 1938 and Nicaragua in 1927 during the Second Nicaraguan Campaign. In Africa during the First Barbary War 1805-05 and in the diplomatic mission to Abyssinia in 1903, the Marine Detachments used camels.

Sources

Military units and formations of the United States Marine Corps